Northwick is a district of Worcester, England, located in the north of the city on the left (east) bank of the River Severn.

History 

Historically, Northwick was a manor in the parish of Claines, and in the Middle Ages the manor house was a residence of the Bishops of Worcester.

Currently in Northwick, two notable buildings/business are Northwick Manor Primary School and Worcester Lawn Tennis Club.

References 
http://www.northwickmanorprimary.co.uk/
http://worcesterltc.co.uk/

Geography of Worcester, England
History of Worcester, England